The 2008 FIA WTCC Race of France was the fourth round of the 2008 World Touring Car Championship season and the fourth running of the FIA WTCC Race of France. It was held on 1 June 2008 at the temporary Circuit de Pau street circuit in Pau, France. It was the headline event of the 2008 Pau Grand Prix. The first race was won by Augusto Farfus, whilst the second race was won by Andy Priaulx.

Classification

Qualifying

Race 1

Race 2

References

External links

France
Race of France
Pau Grand Prix